The 2016 Pan American Rhythmic Gymnastics Championships were held in Merida, Yucatán, Mexico, November 4–9, 2016. The competition was organized by the Mexican Gymnastics Federation, and approved by the International Gymnastics Federation.

Medal summary

Senior medalists

Junior medalists

Medal table

References

2016 in gymnastics
Pan American Gymnastics Championships
International gymnastics competitions hosted by Mexico
2016 in Mexican sports